Leysin American School (also referred to as LAS), founded in 1960 by Fred and Sigrid Ott, is a co-educational independent boarding school focusing on university preparation for grades 7–12 (as well as optional PG and 13th grades). Approximately 340 students attend the school and English is the language of instruction. LAS is located in the alpine resort village of Leysin, Vaud, Switzerland, two hours east of Geneva. The international school is home to students from sixty countries. Approximately 12% of students are American. Students pursue either the American high school diploma or the International Baccalaureate, with additional options of individual IB classes to suit particular interests. LAS also offers an extensive summer school, a pre-high school program for grade 7, and an ESL program. In October 2010, the school celebrated its fiftieth anniversary and officially inaugurated the opening of the newly renovated Grand Hotel, which was originally built in 1892 and houses IB students. LAS facilities include various classroom layouts (including open-plan classrooms in the IB facility), a media center, libraries, blackbox theater, performance hall, computer lab, a new art center, and access to horseback riding, ice skating, tennis, hockey, and swimming. The faculty to student ratio at LAS is 1:8 and the average class size is 12. LAS employs 72 full-time faculty, of which almost all live on campus; 95% are native English speakers, and 70% hold advanced degrees.

Trips
Throughout the year students and faculty take educational trips to destinations around the globe. Students often take weekend trips to other countries in Europe and other parts of the world.

There are mandatory trips referred to as Cultural Trips, which take students to numerous countries, including Romania, Croatia, Italy, Germany, Czech Republic, and many more. Leysin is a two-hour train ride away from Geneva, and an hour from Montreux.

In 2020 the Cultural Trips were cancelled as a COVID-19 safety precaution.

Dormitories
There are eight dormitories for the students, divided by class and by gender. Savoy is the 10th and 11th grade boys' dorm.  It is home to one of the school's dining halls, classrooms for grades 9-10, administration offices, and one of the school's libraries. Vermont is the 7th, 8th and 9th grade girls' dorm, and houses the Travel Office and IT department. Esplanade is the 7th, 8th, and 9th grade boys’ dorm. Beau Site is home to the 10th and 11th grade girls.  The new Belle Époque campus is home to 12th grade boys and girls, (with the students living in separate wings), classrooms for grades 11-12, one of the school's library, and administration offices.

Purchase of Grand Hotel
On June 13, 2008, the Leysin American School purchased the Grand Hôtel at the upper edge of the Leysin village. The 10,000 square meter building and 4.3 hectare grounds were developed in 1890, during the Belle Époque period as a lavish hotel and sanatorium clinic for the world's elite families.  In the early 1980s, after decades of transition in Leysin from health clinics to education centers, the complex became the home of the American College of Switzerland.  Major renovations to the building have been completed and it is now home to the new LAS IB campus.  This campus has a dining hall, the Grand Salle ballroom, new Art Center, The Cave lounge for students, a library, computer lab, and the boys’ and girls’ dormitories.

Leisure
Leysin is a ski and snowboard resort town. During ski season (January–March), LAS has all of the students spend Tuesday and Thursday afternoons on the mountain, either taking lessons (given by instructors from the town) or skiing or snowboarding freely.

References

External links 

 Leysin American School in Switzerland

Boarding schools in Switzerland
Buildings and structures in the canton of Vaud
Secondary schools in Switzerland
Leysin
Private schools in Switzerland
American international schools in Switzerland
International Baccalaureate schools in Switzerland
Educational institutions established in 1961